Way Out! is an album by jazz saxophonist Johnny Griffin, released on the Riverside label in 1958.

Reception

AllMusic reviewer Scott Yanow wrote that "the tenor is in superior form for this spirited date."

Track listing

"Where's Your Overcoat, Boy?" (Richard Evans) – 6:20
"Hot Sausage" (Jody Christian) – 4:07
"Sunny Monday" (John Hines) – 9:58
"Cherokee" (Ray Noble) – 6:47
"Teri's Tune" (Teri Thornton) – 8:06
"Little John" (Hines) – 7:33

Personnel
Johnny Griffin – tenor saxophone
Kenny Drew – piano
Wilbur Ware – bass
Philly Joe Jones – drums

References 

1958 albums
Johnny Griffin albums
Kenny Drew albums
Philly Joe Jones albums